The broadfin sawtail catshark (Galeus nipponensis) is a common species of catshark, part of the family Scyliorhinidae. In addition, adult males have very long claspers that reach past the anal fin. The broadfin sawtail catshark is an opportunistic predator of bony fishes, cephalopods, and crustaceans, with immature and mature sharks being primarily piscivorous. It is oviparous and reproduces year-round.

Taxonomy
The broadfin sawtail catshark has long been lumped together with the closely similar but smaller gecko catshark (G. eastmani), under whose name authors such as Toshiji Kamohara had described it since 1950. This shark was formally described as a new species in a 1975 volume of the scientific journal Memoirs of the Faculty of Fisheries, Hokkaido University by Kazuhiro Nakaya, who gave it the specific epithet nipponensis from Nippon (Japan). Within the genus, this species is closest in morphology to the longnose sawtail catshark (G. longirostris).

Distribution and habitat
The broadfin sawtail catshark is found in the northwestern Pacific from Sagami Bay off southeastern Honshu, Japan to the East China Sea, including the Ryukyu Islands and the Kyushu–Palau Ridge. It is reportedly common in Japanese waters.

Description
The snout is rather long, flattened, and pointed, with large nostrils that bear triangular skin flaps on their anterior rims. The sizable eyes are horizontally oval and equipped with rudimentary nictitating membranes (protective third eyelids). Beneath each eye is a subtle ridge, and behind is a small spiracle. The capacious mouth forms a long, wide arch; well-developed furrows are present at the corners. The small teeth each have a narrow central cusp flanked by usually one, sometimes more, smaller cusplets on both sides. The five pairs of gill slits are short, with the last pair over the pectoral fin bases.

The first dorsal fin is roughly triangular, with gently convex anterior and posterior margins, and originates over the midpoint of the pelvic fin bases. The second dorsal fin is slightly smaller than the first and similar in shape, and originates over the latter portion of the anal fin base. The pectoral fins are medium-sized and broad. The pelvic fins are sizable and relatively low, with angular corners. In adult males, the inner margins of the pelvic fins are partially fused to form an "apron" over the bases of the claspers, which are very long and thin, reaching past the origin of the small anal fin. The base of the anal fin measures 8–10% of the total length, much less than the distances between either the pelvic and anal fins or the two dorsal fins. The anal fin of the male is 2% shorter than that of the female, which may be related to the function of the unusually long claspers. The caudal peduncle is almost cylindrical, and leads to a low caudal fin with a small lower lobe and a ventral notch near the tip of the upper lobe. The dermal denticles are small and overlapping, each with a leaf-shaped crown bearing a median ridge and three marginal teeth. There is a saw-toothed crest of enlarged denticles along the upper edge of the caudal fin. This species is dark gray above, with a series of faint darker saddles along the body and tail. The underside, inside of the mouth, and trailing margins of the pectoral and dorsal fins are white.

Biology and ecology
The broadfin sawtail catshark is an opportunistic predator known to consume a wide variety of bony fishes (including Sardinops melanostictus, Glossandon semifasciatus, Chlorophthalmus albatrossis and lanternfishes), cephalopods (including sepiolid and enoploteuthid squid), and crustaceans (including isopods, krill, and decapods). Young sharks exhibit greater variation in diet across seasons than immature and mature sharks, which consistently feed predominantly on fish. The dietary composition of young sharks in Suruga Bay differs from that of the co-occurring gecko catshark (G. eastmani), perhaps to reduce interspecific competition.

Reproduction in the broadfin sawtail catshark is oviparous; adult females have a single functional ovary, on the right, and two functional oviducts. Only a single egg may mature within each oviduct at a time. Females lay eggs throughout the year, with a peak in December and January.

Human interactions
The International Union for Conservation of Nature (IUCN)  assesses it as Least Concern. It is caught incidentally to an unknown degree in bottom trawls operated by commercial deepwater fisheries off Japan and in the East China Sea.

References

broadfin sawtail catshark
Fish of Japan
Endemic fauna of Japan
Taxa named by Kazuhiro Nakaya
broadfin sawtail catshark